Estadio Campeonísimo is a multi-use stadium in Piura, Peru.  It is currently used by football team Atlético Torino.  The stadium holds 8,000 people. The stadium also holds Copa Peru matches for some of the local teams in Talara.

Atlético Torino
Campeonisimo
Buildings and structures in Piura Region